E331 is a European B class road in Germany, connecting the cities Dortmund – Kassel

Dortmund, Kassel

External links 
 UN Economic Commission for Europe: Overall Map of E-road Network (2007)

331